Joel D. Cooper, F.A.C.S., a thoracic surgeon, is known for having completed the first successful lung transplant and the first successful double lung transplant.

Career
Cooper graduated from Harvard Medical School in 1964, completed his fellowship, and then obtained his first faculty appointment in 1972 at the University of Toronto. He performed the world's first successful lung transplant on pulmonary fibrosis patient Tom Hall on November 7, 1983 at Toronto General Hospital. He performed the world's first successful double lung transplant on emphysema patient Ann Harrison in 1986 at the same hospital. In 1988 he moved to Washington University School of Medicine, and then in 2005 to the Perelman School of Medicine at the University of Pennsylvania. He was the head of thoracic surgery at Washington University. He is currently Emeritus Professor of Surgery in the Division of Thoracic Surgery at The University of Pennsylvania. He was past president of the American Association for Thoracic Surgery, a member of the Institute of Medicine of the National Academy of Sciences, and the recipient of numerous honorary degrees.

Interests
Special interests include areas in general thoracic, esophageal & tracheal surgery, adult lung transplantation, lung-volume reduction surgery, surgical treatment of lung cancer, and swallowing disorders. He is widely recognized for his contributions in the field of tracheal surgery, esophageal surgery, pulmonary physiology, lung transplantation, and surgery for emphysema.

References

American thoracic surgeons
Living people
Harvard Medical School alumni
Washington University in St. Louis faculty
University of Pennsylvania faculty
Foreign Members of the Russian Academy of Sciences
Year of birth missing (living people)
Members of the National Academy of Medicine